Aequorivita soesokkakensis is a Gram-negative, aerobic, non-spore-forming, rod-shaped and motile bacterium from the genus of Aequorivita.

References 

Flavobacteria
Bacteria described in 2014